The 2013 Japanese Championship Super Formula season was the forty-first season of premier Japanese open-wheel motor racing, and the first under the new name of Super Formula. The series was contested over six rounds and a non-championship final round at Fuji Speedway as part of the JAF Grand Prix. 2013 was also the last season using the original chassis (SF13, known as FN09 in previous seasons) by Swift Engineering as for 2014 Dallara would supply a new chassis, the SF14, to the series.

Teams and drivers

Race calendar and results
A provisional calendar for the 2013 season was released on 10 August 2012. All races were held in Japan.

Calendar changes
 On 1 November the first Motegi round, scheduled for 12 May, was taken off the calendar for 2013.
 The race at Inje Speedium, scheduled for 25 August, was cancelled during the 2013 season.
The non-championship JAF Grand Prix was originally scheduled for 17 November but was rescheduled to 24 November.

Championship standings

Drivers' Championship
Scoring system

Teams' Championship

References

External links
Japanese Championship Super Formula official website 

2013
Super Formula
Super Formula